Kaapsehoop Pass is situated in the Mpumalanga province, on the road between Hemlock and Nelspruit (South Africa).

See also
 Kaapsehoop

Mountain passes of Mpumalanga